Edward Acton (28 February 1871 – 31 October 1912) was a West Indian cricketer. He played in ten first-class matches for Jamaica and Trinidad from 1894/95 to 1904/05.

See also
 List of Jamaican representative cricketers

References

External links
 

1871 births
1912 deaths
Jamaica cricketers
Trinidad and Tobago cricketers
People from Pershore